Espinareda de Ancares is a hamlet located in the municipality of Candín, in León province, Castile and León, Spain. As of 2020, it has a population of 8.

Geography 
Espinareda de Ancares is located 144km west-northwest of León, Spain.

References

Populated places in the Province of León